Sukree Etae (born 22 January 1986 in Thailand) is a professional footballer from Thailand. He plays as a striker.

Club career

External links
 Profile at Goal
 

1986 births
Living people
Sukree Etae
Sukree Etae
Association football forwards
Sukree Etae
Sukree Etae
Sukree Etae
Sukree Etae
Sukree Etae
Sukree Etae
Sukree Etae
Sukree Etae
Sukree Etae